The 14th National Hockey League All-Star Game took place at the Montreal Forum on October 1, 1960, which saw the NHL all-stars defeat the hometown Montreal Canadiens 2–1.

A Farewell to the Rocket 
The 14th game was the first all-star game that did not have Maurice "Rocket" Richard in the lineup, as he had retired after winning the Stanley Cup a year ago. The pre-game events both honored the all-stars, as was the norm, but was also a celebration of the Rocket's career. Among the gifts the Rocket received was an alarm clock, which would continually sound unchecked, due to Richard's inability to turn the alarm off.

Replacing the Rocket in the Habs' lineup was Bill Hicke, who played alongside Richard's old linemates, Dickie Moore and younger brother Henri Richard. Other no-shows in this all-star game was Ab McDonald, who was traded to the Chicago Black Hawks, as well as Dean Prentice and Phil Goyette, who were both out with an injury.

All-Star uniforms 
Since 1947, the All-Star uniforms had been red, white, and blue. However, after thirteen years, the NHL decided to change the uniform for this game, and utilize the NHL's official colors of black and orange. The colors had previously been used by the NHL All-Stars in the Ace Bailey Benefit Game and the Babe Siebert Memorial Game, before the All-Star Game had become a regularly-scheduled event.

The new All-Star uniforms were a marked departure from any previous designs used in the NHL. The white uniforms featured black and orange stripes originating from the collar on the front and back side of the jersey, descending down the sleeves, and meeting at the elbows. An additional inner set of stripes formed a loop from the shoulder seam to above the elbows. Two orange stars outlined in black adorned the upper chest of the uniform, with a third star on the upper back. The numbers were black, with orange and black outlines.

These uniforms would continue to be used through the 1963 All-Star Game.

Game summary

Referee: Eddie Powers
Linesmen: George Hayes, Neil Armstrong
Attendance: 13,949

See also
1960–61 NHL season

References
 

National Hockey League All-Star Games
All-Star Game
1960
Ice hockey competitions in Montreal
1960 in Quebec
1960s in Montreal
October 1960 sports events in Canada